Milan Kraft (born January 17, 1980) is a Czech former professional ice hockey centre. He was drafted in the first round, 23rd overall, by the Pittsburgh Penguins in the 1998 NHL Entry Draft.

Starting his career as a youth with hometown team HC Plzeň (the club for which his father of the same name also played in the 1970s and 80s), Kraft played intitially with the Prince Albert Raiders in 1998 after moving to North America. He appeared in 207 games over four seasons with the Penguins, with his most successful season coming in 2003–04 when he scored 19 goals and recorded 21 assists (it was also the only campaign that did not involve him spending some time with the Wilkes–Barre/Scranton Penguins).

This progress was halted by the 2004–05 NHL lockout, during which he returned to the Czech Republic to play for Plzeň and HC Energie Karlovy Vary. He also had a brief stint with Avangard Omsk of the Russian Super League before signing permanently with Karlovy Vary, remaining there until the end of the 2007–08 season and helping them reach the Extraliga finals that year only to be defeated by rivals HC Slavia Praha. He then moved to Slavia and quickly contributed to their winning the 2008–09 regular season Presidential Cup trophy – but they subsequently lost in the play-off finals to Karlovy Vary. Kraft spent the final four years of his career captaining KLH Chomutov (leading the team to promotion in 2012) until announcing his retirement at the conclusion of the 2012–13 season.

Career statistics

Regular season and playoffs

International

References

External links

1980 births
Living people
Avangard Omsk players
Czech ice hockey centres
Czech expatriate ice hockey players in Russia
HC Plzeň players
HC Slavia Praha players
National Hockey League first-round draft picks
Piráti Chomutov players
Pittsburgh Penguins draft picks
Pittsburgh Penguins players
Prince Albert Raiders players
Sportspeople from Plzeň
Wilkes-Barre/Scranton Penguins players
Czech expatriate ice hockey players in Canada
Czech expatriate ice hockey players in the United States